St. Francis Secondary School is a second cycle institution in Jirapa in the Upper West Region of Ghana.

Notable alumni
Margaret Amoakohene, Ghanaian academic and Member of Council of State.

References

Catholic secondary schools in Ghana
Upper West Region